Robyn Addison is an English actress best known for her roles in television series such as Doc Martin, Survivors and Casualty. She has numerous other television drama and theatre credits.

Background
Addison became interested in acting whilst studying for a B.A. in 
English at the University of Cambridge. During this time she appeared in numerous student productions including A Midsummer Night's Dream, Singin' in the Rain and Footlights revue pantomimes. She has a sister named Fiona and a brother named Stuart.

Career
Over two series of Survivors, Addison portrayed the character Sarah Boyer as the character metamorphosed from a self-serving person into an integrated member of the core family of characters and eventually a self-less person who sacrificed herself for the good of humanity.

In the long running BBC series Casualty Addison played the character Joanne Coldwell over thirteen episodes.

Other television performances by Robyn Addison include Lightning Strikes, Inspector George Gently (Series 2 Episode 3 - "Gently in the Blood"), The Street (Season 2 Episode 6) and Dalziel and Pascoe ("Demons on Our Shoulders" – Season 12 Episode 1&2).

She played Anna, Christopher Mead's "Date", in episode 17 of season 5 in Waterloo Road and also appeared in episode 18, where Chris ended their relationship, leaving her broken-hearted.

Addison portrayed Angela in the Zoo Venues production of Abigail's Party at the 2005 Edinburgh Festival.

She played Lydia Languish in The Rivals on tour in the UK between September and November 2010. She started playing Jolene in Chalet Lines at the Bush Theatre in April 2012. She also voiced the companion Sera in Dragon Age: Inquisition. She has played Janice in series 7-10 of Doc Martin which aired in the UK in 2015, 2017, 2019 and 2022.

Filmography

Television

Video games

References

External links 

Robyn Addison at United Agents
BBC interview - Survivors
Digital Spy Interview - Survivors
YouTube - Sarah Bowyer
YouTube - Lightning Strikes
YouTube - Booty Train

Living people
Year of birth missing (living people)
Actresses from Derbyshire
Alumni of Clare College, Cambridge
People from Belper
English television actresses